Audeli (Gestair Airlines) is an aircraft operator based in Madrid, Spain. It operates passenger aircraft on a wet-lease (ACMI -  Aircraft, Crew, Maintenance and Insurance) basis for Iberia Airlines. It also manages a corporate aircraft for Inveravante. It is owned by Cygnus Air (Gestair Cargo) (99%), a member company of Grupo Gestair.

The airline is no longer operating.

Destinations 
Gestair Airlines operates daily to Santo Domingo and 4 times per week to Rio de Janeiro.

Fleet 
The Gestair Airlines fleet consists of the following aircraft (at March 2009):

2 Airbus A340-300 (which are operated for Iberia)
1 Embraer Legacy 600

External links

Audeli Air
Audeli Air Express
Audeli Air Fleet
Audeli Airlines. What Is It?

Airlines of Spain